Yepremyan or Yepremian is an Armenian surname. Notable people with the surname include:

Garo Yepremian (born 1944), American football player
Varuzhan Yepremyan (born 1959), Armenian painter

See also
Yeprem (disambiguation)

Armenian-language surnames